Texas's 7th congressional district of the United States House of Representatives comprises a small area of southwestern Houston and Harris County, along with a northern portion of suburban Fort Bend County. As of the 2000 census, the 7th district comprises 651,620 people. Since 2019, it has been represented by Democrat Lizzie Fletcher.

Before 2022, the district was largely viewed as a wealthy, traditionally Republican district covering much of western Houston and surrounding suburbs. The district’s best known congressman was George H. W. Bush, who later became the 41st president of the United States and retired to the district after his presidency.

Election results from statewide races 
Results Under Current Lines (Since 2023)

Cities within the district

Cities wholly within the district
 Bellaire
 Southside Place
 West University Place

Cities partially in the district
 Houston
 Sugar Land

History

Texas received a seventh congressional district through reapportionment in 1881 as a result of population growth reflected in the 1880 Census; in 1883, Thomas P. Ochiltree, an Independent, was elected its first representative.  From 1882 to 1902 the district was located in north central Texas and was represented by Wacoan Robert L. Henry. After the redistricting of 1902, the district shifted eastward and was represented by Congressmen from Palestine and Galveston.  After 1952, the district again shifted to Waco. From 1885 to 1966, the seventh congressional district elected only Democratic representatives to Congress.

In 1966 the district, then represented by John Dowdy of Waco, was redrawn after the Supreme Court ruled in Wesberry v. Sanders two years earlier that congressional district populations had to be equal or close to equal in population. As a result, the old 7th essentially became the new 2nd district, while a new 7th was created in the western portion of Harris County, home to Houston. Previously, Harris County had been divided between the 8th and 22nd congressional districts. The new 7th stretched from downtown Houston through its fast-growing west side (including the Memorial Villages) out to what were then mostly rural western sections of Harris County including the Addicks and Barker reservoirs, the Katy Prairie and FM 1960. These were among the first areas of Greater Houston to turn Republican as Texas began to gradually shift towards the GOP.

The mid-decade redistricting resulted in the election of George H. W. Bush, a former Chairman of the Harris County Republican Party and the son of former Connecticut U.S. Senator Prescott Bush, and who unsuccessfully sought the state's Class 1 Senate seat against Democrat Ralph Yarborough in 1964. Bush would go on to hold the district for two terms before making an unsuccessful run for the United States Senate in 1970, losing to Lloyd Bentsen who defeated Yarborough in an upset in the Democratic primary. Bush would eventually go on to become Vice President under Ronald Reagan and in 1988 would be elected President. After losing the 1992 election to Bill Clinton, Bush would retire to the 7th where he continued to reside until his death in 2018.

Bush was succeeded by fellow Republican Bill Archer, who would go on to represent the district for 15 terms. Archer would never drop below 79% of the vote as the 7th district, now stretching from the prosperous west side of Houston, including such neighborhoods as River Oaks, Tanglewood, Briargrove, the Energy Corridor and the Memorial Villages, to fast-growing suburbs in the Cypress-Fairbanks and Katy areas and along FM 1960, became reckoned as the most Republican district in the Greater Houston area and arguably one of the most Republican districts in the nation. Archer would rise to prominence in 1994 following the Republican Revolution in which Republicans gained control of the House for the first time in 40 years, with Archer serving as chairman of the influential House Ways and Means Committee for his final three terms.

In 2000, Archer retired from Congress, leading to a highly competitive Republican primary - traditionally the real contest in the heavily Republican district. In the ensuing runoff, State Representative John Culberson, who represented much of the congressional district's western portion, defeated opponent Peter Wareing to win the Republican nomination. By 2002, the district was further reduced in size, now taking in the west side of Houston as well as much of the unincorporated vicinity of the Barker and Addicks reservoirs in west Houston.

Following a controversial 2004 mid-decade redistricting, the district lost Katy and the immediate Barker Reservoir, while also gaining some neighborhoods surrounding Jersey Village and (most penultimately) a southwest section of Houston that encompassed Rice University, the center-right inner suburbs of Bellaire and West University Place, the historically Jewish neighborhood of Meyerland and the historically liberal Montrose area. The latter portion made up the political base of freshman Democratic congressman Chris Bell's 25th district, and historically had not been associated with the 7th during Archer's tenure. While the 7th remained heavily Republican, its dominance was not as strong as in previous elections because of the redistricting. Meanwhile, the bulk of Bell's district had been renumbered as the 9th district and reconfigured as a majority-minority district. Instead of running against Culberson, Bell ran in the Democratic primary for the reconfigured 9th losing to Al Green. Meanwhile, Culberson would go on to win reelection in the 7th against a nominal Democratic challenger in 2004, and won again with under 60 percent of the vote in 2006 in what was considered a bad year for Republicans who lost control of the House for the first time in 12 years.

In 2008, Culberson defeated wind energy executive Michael Skelly to win a fifth term with 56 percent of the vote, despite being vastly outspent by the latter in a surprisingly competitive race–the first that the district had seen in four decades. He was likely helped by John McCain winning the district with 58 percent of the vote in the presidential election. Culberson would go on to win a sixth term in 2010 unopposed.

After the 2012 redistricting process, the 7th lost some of its territory to the adjacent 2nd district of Republican Ted Poe, losing a stretch of territory stretching from north of Jersey Village through Memorial Park to Rice University. In exchange, Culberson gained much of the Greater Katy area south of Interstate 10, as well as a stretch of middle-class suburban areas along the western edge of Highway 6 that had growing Hispanic populations, which also existed in the Sharpstown and Gulfton areas of southwest Houston that were also added to Culberson's district.

Despite the changes, Culberson continued to win reelection in his three successive elections, beating Democratic opponent James Cargas in three consecutive elections from 2012 to 2016. However, the district was one of 23 congressional districts that voted for Democratic presidential candidate Hillary Clinton in 2016 after voting Mitt Romney in 2012, due in part to backlash from some constituents of Republican Donald Trump's campaign rhetoric and stances on such issues as trade and immigration. District residents' favoritism towards free trade and comprehensive immigration reform clashed with Trump's populist stances on these issues. The district swung 23 percent to the left from 2012, more than any other in the nation outside of Utah. Combined with demographic changes in parts of the district as well as the aftermath of Hurricane Harvey, which caused catastrophic damage to many parts of the district in 2017, some political analysts argued the district could be vulnerable to a Democratic takeover in a wave election.

In 2018, Culberson ran against corporate litigator Lizzie Fletcher, who prevailed out of a crowded and well-funded Democratic primary that gained national attention when supporters of Fletcher's primary runoff opponent, journalist and progressive activist Laura Moser, cried foul over the Democratic Congressional Campaign Committee's supposed preference for Fletcher over Moser in the primary. Despite this controversy, Fletcher prevailed by a comfortable margin in the primary runoff later that May. The race was one of the most closely watched in the nation that year, with Fletcher consistently outraising Culberson throughout the general election. Despite Culberson's proactive leadership in the wake of Hurricane Harvey, Fletcher defeated Culberson to become the first Democrat to represent the district since its realignment as a Houston-based seat in 1966, as the 7th became one of 43 Republican seats (over 1/6th of the Republican conference) to flip Democratic in the 2018 election. Culberson held his own in his longtime base of west Houston and Memorial, areas that have been the district's core for its entire existence in its present configuration; he'd represented much of this area for over three decades at the state and federal levels. However, Fletcher swamped him in the portions of southwest Houston that were added in the 2004 redistricting, as well as in the Hispanic-plurality Bear Creek area near the Addicks Reservoir that was heavily affected by flooding from Harvey. As a measure of how Republican the district had historically been, Fletcher was only the fourth Democrat to even garner 40 percent of the vote in the district. Fletcher was reelected in 2020 with 50 percent of the vote over Republican challenger Wesley Hunt, likely helped by Joe Biden winning the district with 54 percent of the vote.

For the 2022 elections, in order to protect surrounding Republican incumbents, the Republican-controlled Texas Legislature redrew the 7th into a heavily Democratic district connecting northern portions of Fort Bend County (including western parts of Sugar Land with largely Asian-American populations) with much of the Westpark Tollway corridor of southwest Houston and Harris County (including the Alief and Mission Bend areas), along with much of inner western Houston inside Loop 610 including portions of the Heights, Midtown, Montrose, Meyerland, Braeswood Place and Timbergrove Manor neighborhoods, as well as The Galleria, Greenway Plaza and the "island suburbs" of Bellaire, West University Place and Southside Place. Most of the 7th's longtime constituency in west Houston, including Memorial City, the Energy Corridor and its entire stretch of the Katy Freeway, as well as the Memorial Villages, Memorial Park, the River Oaks neighborhood and its share of the Greater Katy area, was moved over to the newly drawn 38th District that is expected to strongly favor Republicans, while many of the areas near the Addicks Reservoir (home to large numbers of middle-class Hispanics) were moved into the 8th District. While the new 7th is not as heavily Democratic as the nearby 9th, 18th and 29th districts, Joe Biden won over 60 percent of the vote in the new 7th in 2020 (even though much of the new district was friendlier to Republicans in past elections), securing the district as a safe seat for Fletcher barring any future redistricting challenges or internal factional trends within the Republican Party.

In 2022, Fletcher won a third term in the newly reconfigured 7th District, defeating Republican challenger Johnny Teague; Fletcher's 2020 challenger, Wesley Hunt, would himself be elected to the new 38th anchored in the 7th's old base in west Houston by a comfortable margin.

List of members representing the district

Recent election results

2004

2006

2008

2010

2012

2014

2016

2018

2020

See also

 List of United States congressional districts

References

Citations

Sources 

 Office of the Secretary of State - 1992 - Current ELECTION HISTORY
 
 
 Congressional Biographical Directory of the United States 1774–present

07
Harris County, Texas
George H. W. Bush